Saupe is a surname. Notable people with the surname include:

Alfred Saupe (1925–2008), German physicist
Dietmar Saupe (born 1954), German academic